Johann Christian Strenge (October 24, 1757 – 1825) was an American fraktur artist.

He became one of many Hessians who served the British crown in the American Revolution, Strenge enlisted in 1776 and, under the command of Johann Rall, arrived in New York in August of that year. Taken prisoner in the aftermath of the Battle of Trenton, he was later released to the British. By the time his military unit had been discharged in 1783, he had deserted. He move to Hempfield in Lancaster County, Pennsylvania; he married and had a daughter, but both wife and child died. With his second wife he would have five children. The family moved in the 1790s to East Petersburg, Pennsylvania, where he began a teaching career; he taught at least one term in Chester County as well. He worked as a scrivener as well, and in 1811 was named justice of the peace.

Although he himself had been baptized in the Reformed Church, Stenge was a schoolmaster for the Mennonite community, which informed the style of his fraktur; he produced writing samples, family records, Bible entries, bookplates, and a variety of presentation pieces. From Christian Alsdorff he learned the tradition of making books of musical notation. He also made baptismal records for Lutheran and Reformed neighbors. His presentation pieces incorporate symbols such as birds and hearts, as well as sayings. Strenge also produced complex love letters designed for young men to give to young women; also surviving is an image of the Crucifixion. His paintings are distinguished by their color scheme, incorporating bright oranges and reds.
One of Strenge's love letters is held by the American Folk Art Museum. Three pieces are in the collection of the Winterthur Museum.

References

1757 births
1825 deaths
American male painters
Fraktur artists
Schoolteachers from Pennsylvania
Painters from Pennsylvania
18th-century American painters
18th-century American male artists
19th-century American painters
19th-century American male artists
German emigrants to the Thirteen Colonies
Hessian military personnel of the American Revolutionary War
People from Kassel (district)
People from Lancaster County, Pennsylvania
People of colonial Pennsylvania
American justices of the peace
18th-century American educators
19th-century American educators